Khuy Dul (also Romanized as Khūy Dūl) is a village in Masal Rural District, in the Central District of Masal County, Gilan Province, Iran. Its existence was first mentioned in the 2006 Iranian census; however, its population was not mentioned.

References 

Populated places in Masal County